Lev Biryuk is a Ukrainian politician, People's Deputy of Ukraine of the 4th, 5th and 6th convocations of Verkhovna Rada of Ukraine. In 2011 he was awarded with Order of Merit, III class.

Biography

Lev Biryuk was born on May 31, 1946, in Horodnia, Chernihiv region. In 1956 the family moved to Khmelnytsky.

Education
Lev Biryuk studied in secondary school No. 1 in Khmelnitsky, in 1988 he graduated from Kamenetz-Podolsk Pedagogical Institute (in absentia), as teacher of physical culture and sports.

Career

 1963–1967 – worked at a brick factory, at a press-forging equipment plant in Khmelnitsky
 1967–1969 – service in Soviet Army
 1969–1977 – worked as electrician on ships, international routes, Novorossiysk Shipping Company
 1977–1992 – assembly fitter, fitness instruktor at Khmelnitsk plant "Temp", senior lecturer at Khmelnitsk technical school No. 25
 1990–2005 – assistant-consultant of People's Deputy of Ukraine

Politics

 March 2005–May 2006 – People's Deputy of the 4th Verkhovna Rada, elected from Yushchenko bloc "Our Ukraine», No. 76 in the list
 Member of the Social Policy and Labour Committee (since May 2005)
 March 2005 – BYuT fraction member
 May 2006–June 2007 – People's Deputy of the 5th Verkhovna Rada of Ukraine, elected from Yulia Tymoshenko Bloc, No. 111 in the list
 Member of the Social Policy and Labour Committee (since July 2006)
 May 2006 – BYuT fraction member
 November 2007 – People's Deputy of the 6th Verkhovna Rada of Ukraine, elected from the Yulia Tymoshenko Bloc, No. 112 in the list
 Chairman of the Subcommittee on the organization of Supreme Rada of Ukraine, Committee on Rules, Ethics and Support to Work of The Verkhovna Rada of Ukraine
 Counting Board Member of the 6th Verkhovna Rada of Ukraine
 Member of the Permanent Delegation to the Parliamentary Assembly of the Organization for Security and Cooperation in Europe
 Head of the Group for Interparliamentary Relations with the Great Socialist People's Libyan Arab Jamahiriya
 Member of the Group for Interparliamentary Relations with the United Kingdom of Great Britain and Northern Ireland
 Member of the Group for Interparliamentary Relations with the United States of America
 Member of the Group for Interparliamentary Relations with the Federal Republic of Germany
 Member of the Group for Interparliamentary Relations with the Kingdom of Denmark
 Member of the Group for Interparliamentary Relations with the Socialist Republic of Vietnam
 Member of the Group for Interparliamentary Relations with Montenegro
 Member of the Group for Interparliamentary Relations with the South African Republic
 Member of the Group for Interparliamentary Relations with the Kingdom of the Netherlands
 Member of the Group for Interparliamentary Relations with France
 Member of the Group for Interparliamentary Relations with the Italian Republic

In 2012 he was not re-elected into parliament and did not appear on the party list of "Fatherland".

Social activities

A member of the People's Movement of Ukraine (Rukh):

 Chairman of Khmelnytsky city organization of Rukh (in 1989–1999)
 Head of Organising Office of the Rukh Secretariat (1992–1993)
 Member of the Central Office of Rukh (1992–1999)
 Chairman of Khmelnytsky city organization of Rukh (1994–1997)
 Chairman of Khmelnitsky regional organization of Rukh (1997–1999)

Family
Lev Biryuk is married with two children: daughter Julia and son Dmitry; his wife Nataliya is and engineer at "Oblpalyvo" company.

References

See also
2007 Ukrainian parliamentary election
List of Ukrainian Parliament Members 2007
People's Movement of Ukraine

Living people
Fourth convocation members of the Verkhovna Rada
Fifth convocation members of the Verkhovna Rada
Sixth convocation members of the Verkhovna Rada
All-Ukrainian Union "Fatherland" politicians
People's Movement of Ukraine politicians
Recipients of the Order of Merit (Ukraine), 3rd class
1946 births
People from Chernihiv Oblast